Provallia Steppe Nature Reserve is a protected nature reserve of Ukraine that covers two tracts of representative steppe on the eastern Ukrainian border with Russia.  As of 2014, the reserve was no longer under the control of the Ukraine government.  The reserve is in the administrative district of Sverdlovsk Raion in Luhansk Oblast

Topography
The reserve is organized in two separate tracts:
 Kalinivska.  Laced with shallow streams (less than 1 meter in depth), and rocky sections.  (300 ha)
 Hrushevskaya.  Centered on the Hrushevska Gorge, and a large pond (Cataar).  (288 ha)
The reserve is immediately on the eastern border of Ukraine with Russia.  Geologically, it is on the northern edge of the Donetsk folded country, characterized by sandstone, limestone, and sandy shales of the Carboniferous Period.  The terrain is ridge-hollow, with elevations 150-230 meters above sea level.

Climate and ecoregion
The climate of the Provallia Steppe reserve is Humid continental climate, warm summer (Köppen climate classification (Dfb)).

The reserve is located in the Pontic–Caspian steppe ecoregion, a region that covers an expanse of grasslands stretching from the northern shores of the Black Sea to western Kazakhstan.

Flora and fauna
Approximately 88% of the site is grassland (steppe), and 12% is forest (mostly in ravines and along rivers).

Public use
As a strict nature reserve, Provallia Steppe's primary purpose is protection of nature and scientific study.  There is no public access, and as of 2014 the site was not under government control.

See also
 Lists of Nature Preserves of Ukraine (class Ia protected areas)
 National Parks of Ukraine (class II protected areas)

References

External links
 
 Map of Provallia Steppe Nature Reserve on OpenStreetMap.org

Nature reserves in Ukraine